The Omsk constituency (No.139) is a Russian legislative constituency in Omsk Oblast. Until 2007 the constituency covered parts of urban Omsk, its suburbs and rural southeastern Omsk Oblast. The configuration of the constituency stayed largely intact after 2015 redistricting but Omsk constituency switched Kuybyshevsky and Leninsky City Districts of Omsk for Tsentralny City District from now-eliminated Central constituency.

Members elected

Election results

1993

|-
! colspan=2 style="background-color:#E9E9E9;text-align:left;vertical-align:top;" |Candidate
! style="background-color:#E9E9E9;text-align:left;vertical-align:top;" |Party
! style="background-color:#E9E9E9;text-align:right;" |Votes
! style="background-color:#E9E9E9;text-align:right;" |%
|-
|style="background-color:"|
|align=left|Viktor Lotkov
|align=left|Independent
|
|41.22%
|-
|style="background-color:"|
|align=left|Yury Vinokurov
|align=left|Independent
| -
|20.60%
|-
| colspan="5" style="background-color:#E9E9E9;"|
|- style="font-weight:bold"
| colspan="3" style="text-align:left;" | Total
| 
| 100%
|-
| colspan="5" style="background-color:#E9E9E9;"|
|- style="font-weight:bold"
| colspan="4" |Source:
|
|}

1995

|-
! colspan=2 style="background-color:#E9E9E9;text-align:left;vertical-align:top;" |Candidate
! style="background-color:#E9E9E9;text-align:left;vertical-align:top;" |Party
! style="background-color:#E9E9E9;text-align:right;" |Votes
! style="background-color:#E9E9E9;text-align:right;" |%
|-
|style="background-color:"|
|align=left|Oleg Smolin
|align=left|Independent
|
|28.49%
|-
|style="background-color:"|
|align=left|Mikhail Poltoranin
|align=left|Independent
|
|14.65%
|-
|style="background-color:"|
|align=left|Vyacheslav Nikolyuk
|align=left|Independent
|
|12.94%
|-
|style="background-color:"|
|align=left|Mikhail Penkin
|align=left|Communist Party
|
|7.98%
|-
|style="background-color:#FE4801"|
|align=left|Sergey Arbuzov
|align=left|Pamfilova–Gurov–Lysenko
|
|6.66%
|-
|style="background-color:"|
|align=left|Vladimir Ispravnikov
|align=left|Independent
|
|6.19%
|-
|style="background-color:"|
|align=left|Gennady Sidorov
|align=left|Liberal Democratic Party
|
|4.94%
|-
|style="background-color:"|
|align=left|Valentina Sokolova
|align=left|Our Home – Russia
|
|2.49%
|-
|style="background-color:#C28314"|
|align=left|Vladimir Vshivtsev
|align=left|For the Motherland!
|
|1.63%
|-
|style="background-color:"|
|align=left|Larisa Savelyeva
|align=left|Independent
|
|1.57%
|-
|style="background-color:#016436"|
|align=left|Rafael Sharafutdinov
|align=left|Nur
|
|0.99%
|-
|style="background-color:"|
|align=left|Nikolay Afanasyev
|align=left|Independent
|
|0.76%
|-
|style="background-color:#2998D5"|
|align=left|Konstantin Kharlamov
|align=left|Russian All-People's Movement
|
|0.37%
|-
|style="background-color:#00A200"|
|align=left|Aleksandr Tsalko
|align=left|Transformation of the Fatherland
|
|0.26%
|-
|style="background-color:#000000"|
|colspan=2 |against all
|
|7.01%
|-
| colspan="5" style="background-color:#E9E9E9;"|
|- style="font-weight:bold"
| colspan="3" style="text-align:left;" | Total
| 
| 100%
|-
| colspan="5" style="background-color:#E9E9E9;"|
|- style="font-weight:bold"
| colspan="4" |Source:
|
|}

1999

|-
! colspan=2 style="background-color:#E9E9E9;text-align:left;vertical-align:top;" |Candidate
! style="background-color:#E9E9E9;text-align:left;vertical-align:top;" |Party
! style="background-color:#E9E9E9;text-align:right;" |Votes
! style="background-color:#E9E9E9;text-align:right;" |%
|-
|style="background-color:"|
|align=left|Oleg Smolin (incumbent)
|align=left|Communist Party
|
|41.82%
|-
|style="background-color:"|
|align=left|Vladimir Lapin
|align=left|Independent
|
|20.64%
|-
|style="background-color:#C21022"|
|align=left|Vladimir Sedelnikov
|align=left|Party of Pensioners
|
|8.56%
|-
|style="background-color:"|
|align=left|Vladimir Dobrovolsky
|align=left|Independent
|
|7.26%
|-
|style="background-color:"|
|align=left|Andrey Avdeychikov
|align=left|Independent
|
|1.85%
|-
|style="background-color:"|
|align=left|Vyacheslav Rosinsky
|align=left|Liberal Democratic Party
|
|1.73%
|-
|style="background-color:"|
|align=left|Lyubov Neklyudova
|align=left|Independent
|
|1.67%
|-
|style="background-color:#084284"|
|align=left|Eduard Smolyagin
|align=left|Spiritual Heritage
|
|1.58%
|-
|style="background-color:"|
|align=left|Sergey Mizya
|align=left|Russian All-People's Union
|
|1.34%
|-
|style="background-color:#FF4400"|
|align=left|German Kozlovsky
|align=left|Andrey Nikolayev and Svyatoslav Fyodorov Bloc
|
|0.96%
|-
|style="background-color:"|
|align=left|Olga Maksakova
|align=left|Independent
|
|0.69%
|-
|style="background-color:#000000"|
|colspan=2 |against all
|
|10.06%
|-
| colspan="5" style="background-color:#E9E9E9;"|
|- style="font-weight:bold"
| colspan="3" style="text-align:left;" | Total
| 
| 100%
|-
| colspan="5" style="background-color:#E9E9E9;"|
|- style="font-weight:bold"
| colspan="4" |Source:
|
|}

2003

|-
! colspan=2 style="background-color:#E9E9E9;text-align:left;vertical-align:top;" |Candidate
! style="background-color:#E9E9E9;text-align:left;vertical-align:top;" |Party
! style="background-color:#E9E9E9;text-align:right;" |Votes
! style="background-color:#E9E9E9;text-align:right;" |%
|-
|style="background-color:"|
|align=left|Oleg Smolin (incumbent)
|align=left|Communist Party
|
|47.83%
|-
|style="background-color:"|
|align=left|Khabulda Shushubayev
|align=left|Independent
|
|20.63%
|-
|style="background-color:"|
|align=left|Vladimir Bolshakov
|align=left|Liberal Democratic Party
|
|6.94%
|-
|style="background:#1042A5"| 
|align=left|Dmitry Sheyko
|align=left|Union of Right Forces
|
|4.34%
|-
|style="background-color:#164C8C"|
|align=left|Nikolay Salokhin
|align=left|United Russian Party Rus'
|
|3.13%
|-
|style="background-color:"|
|align=left|Sergey Tolmachev
|align=left|Agrarian Party
|
|3.01%
|-
|style="background-color:#000000"|
|colspan=2 |against all
|
|12.67%
|-
| colspan="5" style="background-color:#E9E9E9;"|
|- style="font-weight:bold"
| colspan="3" style="text-align:left;" | Total
| 
| 100%
|-
| colspan="5" style="background-color:#E9E9E9;"|
|- style="font-weight:bold"
| colspan="4" |Source:
|
|}

2016

|-
! colspan=2 style="background-color:#E9E9E9;text-align:left;vertical-align:top;" |Candidate
! style="background-color:#E9E9E9;text-align:left;vertical-align:top;" |Party
! style="background-color:#E9E9E9;text-align:right;" |Votes
! style="background-color:#E9E9E9;text-align:right;" |%
|-
|style="background-color: " |
|align=left|Viktor Shreyder
|align=left|United Russia
|
|31.00%
|-
|style="background-color:"|
|align=left|Andrey Alekhin
|align=left|Communist Party
|
|30.17%
|-
|style="background-color:"|
|align=left|Aleksey Klepikov
|align=left|Liberal Democratic Party
|
|12.03%
|-
|style="background-color:"|
|align=left|Dmitry Gorovtsov
|align=left|A Just Russia
|
|8.36%
|-
|style="background-color:"|
|align=left|Tatyana Yeremenko
|align=left|Party of Growth
|
|3.61%
|-
|style="background:"| 
|align=left|Aleksandr Barkov
|align=left|Communists of Russia
|
|3.46%
|-
|style="background:"| 
|align=left|Sergey Kostarev
|align=left|Yabloko
|
|3.08%
|-
|style="background:"| 
|align=left|Igor Basov
|align=left|People's Freedom Party
|
|1.80%
|-
|style="background:"| 
|align=left|Nikolay Artemyev
|align=left|Civic Platform
|
|1.64%
|-
| colspan="5" style="background-color:#E9E9E9;"|
|- style="font-weight:bold"
| colspan="3" style="text-align:left;" | Total
| 
| 100%
|-
| colspan="5" style="background-color:#E9E9E9;"|
|- style="font-weight:bold"
| colspan="4" |Source:
|
|}

2021

|-
! colspan=2 style="background-color:#E9E9E9;text-align:left;vertical-align:top;" |Candidate
! style="background-color:#E9E9E9;text-align:left;vertical-align:top;" |Party
! style="background-color:#E9E9E9;text-align:right;" |Votes
! style="background-color:#E9E9E9;text-align:right;" |%
|-
|style="background-color:"|
|align=left|Andrey Alekhin
|align=left|Communist Party
|
|31.68%
|-
|style="background-color: " |
|align=left|Stepan Bonkovsky
|align=left|United Russia
|
|27.29%
|-
|style="background-color: " |
|align=left|Natalya Tuzova
|align=left|New People
|
|7.94%
|-
|style="background-color:"|
|align=left|Viktor Zharkov
|align=left|A Just Russia — For Truth
|
|7.75%
|-
|style="background:"| 
|align=left|Aleksey Baykov
|align=left|Communists of Russia
|
|7.09%
|-
|style="background-color: "|
|align=left|Gennady Pavlov
|align=left|Party of Pensioners
|
|5.18%
|-
|style="background-color:"|
|align=left|Anton Berendeyev
|align=left|Liberal Democratic Party
|
|5.00%
|-
|style="background: "| 
|align=left|Tatyana Shneyder
|align=left|Yabloko
|
|2.47%
|-
| colspan="5" style="background-color:#E9E9E9;"|
|- style="font-weight:bold"
| colspan="3" style="text-align:left;" | Total
| 
| 100%
|-
| colspan="5" style="background-color:#E9E9E9;"|
|- style="font-weight:bold"
| colspan="4" |Source:
|
|}

Notes

References

Russian legislative constituencies
Politics of Omsk Oblast